Swallow Reef, also known as ; ; Mandarin ; Celerio Reef, is an oceanic atoll of the Spratly Islands administered by Malaysia, which is situated approximately  northwest of Kota Kinabalu, Sabah. The atoll is about 7 km long and 2 km wide with a central lagoon.

The Royal Malaysian Navy (RMN) has maintained a presence on the reef since 1983, but as with all of the Spratly Islands, the ownership is disputed, and it is also claimed by the People's Republic of China, the Republic of China (Taiwan) and Vietnam. The Philippines does not lay claim to Swallow Reef.

The island has gained recognition as a destination for scuba divers. Layang Layang is especially known for the hammerhead sharks during the May mating season. Its air transport needs are served by the Layang-Layang Airport.

History

On 21 June 1980, a plaque was erected on the reef by Malaysia's PASKAL special forces.

In May 1983, eighteen PASKAL members built their first encampment, signifying the start of the Royal Malaysian Navy's presence. At the time, the only infrastructure available was a helipad for personnel transfer, and the special forces had to camp under the open skies on the bare reef.  Naval Station "Lima" was constructed in April 1986, consisting of a small living-cum-operations centre.

In 1989, the government decided to develop the island into a tourist spot.

By 1991, the resort had completed construction and had developed into a comfortable and popular diving spot.

By 1995, more buildings were added, including two air-conditioned accommodation blocks, an aircraft landing strip, two hangars, a radar station, an air traffic control tower, watchtowers and a jetty.

As a result, the length of the island increased from 1.2 kilometres to over 1.5 kilometres.

In July 2004, a marine research facility, MARSAL (Marine Research Station Pulau Layang-Layang) was opened.

On 5 March 2009, Abdullah Ahmad Badawi, the Malaysian Prime Minister of the time, visited the island.

Tourism

The island has a reputation as a destination for scuba divers, with clear water and a variety of marine life including hammerhead sharks, pygmy seahorses, jack fish, barracuda and manta rays.

Facilities

Layang-Layang Airport 

The airport consists of a paved aircraft runway, two aircraft hangars, a radar station, an air traffic control tower and watchtowers. The runway, made of concrete, is 1367m long and 28m wide. The runway has a Pavement Classification Number of 032RBXU, indicating that the runway is a medium strength rigid pavement, with a high maximum tire pressure.

The aviation facilities on the island allow the operation of C130 Hercules transport planes and CN-235 maritime patrol aircraft of the Royal Malaysian Air Force (RMAF). Layang Layang Aerospace offers flights for civilians to and from the airport.

Layang-Layang Resort 
Layang-Layang is a 3 star resort located on the island open from 28 February – 1 September. It has 86 rooms and shares the look of a Borneo Longhouse, the traditional community homes of Borneo's tribal people. The resort's restaurant serves Asian and Western Cuisine. There are also fresh water swimming pools and a body massage and foot reflexology centre called Raba Raba House.

Naval Station Lima 

The Royal Malaysian Navy has maintained an "offshore naval station" on the island since 1983, and CB90 assault craft based in the station patrol the surrounding waters. Several anti-ship and anti-aircraft guns are placed around the reef, and the personnel operate a Starburst air defence system to prevent low level attacks on the island.

The jetty is located inside the lagoon of the submerged atoll, and has access to the sea through a man-made path cleared of corals.

The naval personnel are normally stationed on the island on a three-month rotational deployment, transferring from Kota Kinabalu, where the Naval Area Base II (Mawila II) is located.

Marine Research Station 
The Malaysian Fisheries department operates a marine research facility, MARSAL (Marine Research Station Pulau Layang-Layang) on the island.

Utilities

Electricity 
The main power source of the island comes from diesel generators. On the naval station, there is a large windmill maintained by state-owned power company Tenaga Nasional which harnesses power from wind speeds of up to 50 knots to provide additional electricity supply to the base.

Water 
The island's clean water supply of 57 tons per day is obtained from a distilled water processing plant.

Post service 
In 2015, Malaysia launched a postcode for those living on the island.

Internet and mobile cellular connectivities 
Internet services are currently been improved and mobile connectivities will be improved from 2G to 4G by Malaysian Communications and Multimedia Commission.

Climate 
Swallow Reef is located within the equatorial belt and has an equatorial climate. It is closed to tourists from November to January each year due to heavy monsoon rains, however, Malaysian Armed Forces personnel operate on the island year-long. Temperatures range from 24 to 32 °C. Although an equatorial climate comes with fairly high humidity, there are cooling sea breezes.

Accessibility 
The only civilian flight route to Swallow Reef is a one-hour flight from Sabah's capital Kota Kinabalu. Layang Layang Aerospace is the only airline that services this route, using its fleet of Nomad N22C planes. A return ticket must be purchased before departure from Kota Kinabalu International Airport.

The Royal Malaysian Navy uses CB90 boats for access to the area and also stations the boats on the island for patrols in the area. The Royal Malaysian Air Force uses CN235 and C130 Hercules aircraft as well as Nuri helicopters for access to the island.

See also
List of airports in the Spratly Islands

References

External links 

 Maritime Transparency Initiative Island Tracker
 

Reefs of the Spratly Islands
Landforms of Sabah
Landforms of Malaysia
Atolls of the Pacific Ocean